Haag is a town in the district of Amstetten in Lower Austria in Austria. It is at the geographical centre of Europe.

In the past, Haag has been referred to by some Austrians as the "Mormon village" because it was where many of the nation's small number of Mormons would hold meetings since the beginning of the 20th century.

Populations

References

Cities and towns in Amstetten District